Etienne! is a 2009 American comedy film written and directed by Jeff Mizushima. It stars Richard Vallejos, Sophia Myles and Courtney Halverson. It was released on 12 June 2009 at the CineVegas International Film Festival and was an instant hit.

Cast
Richard Vallejos as Richard
Megan Taylor Harvey as Elodie
Sophia Myles as Sophia 
Courtney Halverson as Tara
David Fine as Kenly
Caveh Zahedi as Man in coat
Jeremiah Turner as Doug
Matt Garron as Matt
Rachel Stolte as Rachel
Solon Bixler as Solon
Anthony Kuan as Anthony
Molly Livingston as Molly
Jerry Mosher as Dr. Mosher
Marisa Pedroso as Marion
Claudia Pedroso as Marion's Mother
Vito Razi as Vito
Lisa Strauss as Shannon
Debaveye Thibault as Backpacker
Sarah Virden as Sarah

Reception
The film was a hit with critics. The Hollywood Reporter named it an "oddball charmer" of a film and 'the unofficial feel-good film of the fest'. Others liked the 'feel-good' atmosphere of the film and the cheerful 1960s setting along with its celebrity cameo appearances. The film has a rating of 88% on Rotten Tomatoes. The New York Times  labelled the film as "enormously likable".

References

External links
 

2000s English-language films